Long Island University Field is a baseball, soccer, and softball venue in Brooklyn, New York, United States.  It was home to the LIU Brooklyn Blackbirds baseball, men's and women's soccer, women's lacrosse, and softball teams of the NCAA Division I Northeast Conference until 2019, when LIU Brooklyn merged its athletics teams with those of LIU Post into a single unit, henceforth known as the Sharks, competing in Division I. Since then, the LIU baseball, soccer, women's lacrosse, and softball teams now play at the Post campus in Brookville, east of Brooklyn. The venue, which features an artificial turf surface, has a capacity of 2,000 spectators for soccer and lacrosse and 500 spectators for baseball and softball.

References 

LIU Brooklyn Blackbirds baseball
College baseball venues in the United States
College lacrosse venues in the United States
College soccer venues in the United States
College softball venues in the United States
Baseball venues in New York City
Lacrosse venues in New York City
Soccer venues in New York City
Sports venues in Brooklyn